Sam Chedgzoy (27 January 1889 – 7 January 1967) was an English footballer who changed the laws of the game. He played professionally for Everton, the New Bedford Whalers and Montreal Carsteel. He also earned eight caps with the England national team.

Biography

Club career
Born 27 January 1889 in Ellesmere Port, England, Chedgzoy began his professional career with Everton F.C. in 1910, joining the club from amateur side Burnell's Ironworks. He spent sixteen seasons with the Blues, predominantly was a right wing forward. Everton were runners up in the then top division, Division 1, in the 1911–12 season; and won the championship 1914–15. In total, Chedgzoy made 300 appearances (279 in the league) for Everton. He scored thirty-six goals, with thirty-three coming in league games. Chedgzoy also guested for West Ham United during World War One, making 28 appearances and scoring 14 goals.

American Soccer League 
In 1926, Chedgzoy emigrated to the United States where he signed with New Bedford Whalers of the American Soccer League.

Canada 
Chedgzoy gained his first taste of Canada while vacationing there in 1922. In 1924, he spent the English League off season as manager of The Canadian Grenadier Guards, a Canadian armed forces team which competed in the Interprovincial League. When he left the Whalers in 1930, Len Peto, owner of Montreal Carsteel hired Chedgzoy as the team's player-coach in the National Soccer League. In his ten years with the club, he took them to seven league finals, losing the first four before winning the 1936, 1939 and 1940 titles. He made his final appearance as a player for Carsteel in the Canadian Club Final in 1939 at the age of fifty. He remained in Montreal until his death on 7 January 1967.

Chedgzoy was inducted into the Canadian Soccer Hall of Fame in 2005.

National team 
Chedgzoy earned his first cap with England in a 2–1 loss to Wales on 15 March 1920. He went on play a total of eight games with England, his last a 3–1 victory over Northern Ireland on 22 October 1924.

Changing the laws of the game 
In 1926, he forced a change in the laws of the game when he almost scored by dribbling the ball in from a corner kick. Contrary to popular belief, he hit the side netting and did not score. Prior to 1924 a goal could only be scored from a corner kick if another player made contact with the ball. In that year, the International Football Association Board (IFAB) changed the laws of football so that a goal could be scored directly from a corner kick (without another player touching the ball). However, the wording of the new law was vague. A Liverpool Echo sports journalist, Ernest Edwards, informed the Everton side of the lack of precision in the new rules. During a game against Woolwich Arsenal, Everton gained a corner kick that Chedgzoy took. Instead of crossing the ball in, he dribbled the ball into the penalty area and nearly scored while the other players and referee looked on in shock – and then he successfully persuaded the referee that the rules permitted this way of scoring a goal. After deliberation by the Football Association, it was decided that the goal was legal, and the law was amended making it clear that the player taking the corner could only strike the ball  before another player must make contact. This ensures that corner kicks cannot become corner dribbles, but also permits a goal to be scored direct from a corner.

Personal life 
His son, Sydney (1911–1983), was also a footballer who played for various clubs in the 1930s. Chedgzoy served as a private in the Scots Guards during the First World War.

References

External links
 Page on Chedgzoy from Everton F.C.'s web site
 / Canada Soccer Hall of Fame
 "Cornered", another account from (Canada's) The Soccer Hall of Fame and Museum
 "Eleven New Members Inducted into the Ontario Soccer Association Hall of Fame", Lower Island Soccer News, 9 May 2005
 Canada Soccer Hall of Fame profile

1889 births
1967 deaths
People from Ellesmere Port
English footballers
Association football wingers
English Football League players
England international footballers
Everton F.C. players
Cardiff City F.C. wartime guest players
English expatriate footballers
English expatriate sportspeople in the United States
English emigrants to Canada
American Soccer League (1921–1933) players
Expatriate soccer players in Canada
Expatriate soccer players in the United States
Montreal Carsteel players
New Bedford Whalers players
English football managers
Canada Soccer Hall of Fame inductees
English Football League representative players
Sportspeople from Cheshire
British Army personnel of World War I
Scots Guards soldiers
English expatriate sportspeople in Canada
Canadian National Soccer League players
Canadian National Soccer League coaches